John Montgomery (1951–2005) was an American art historian, illustrator, and author specialising in Pre-Columbian art.

References

1951 births
2005 deaths
American art historians